Line 19 of the Beijing Subway is a rapid transit line in Beijing. It is fully underground.

Description
Phase 1 of Line 19 begins at Mudanyuan station in Haidian District and ends at Xingong station in Fengtai District. The line was envisioned as a major relief line for the overcrowded Line 4 and more direct link to the Beijing Financial Street commercial area.

The line uses 8-car type A rolling stock.

Phase II extensions north and south run through suburban areas and will be built to more generous alignments allowing for  operations.

Opening timeline

Stations (Phase I)

History
It was reported in February 2012 as one of six new lines under planning by the city's public transit planning authorities. As of 2015, the line was renamed to Line 19 with the first phase starting construction in 2016. The line opened on 31 December 2021. Four infill stations opened on 30 July 2022.

Future development
Phase 2 of Line 19, which is under planning, consists of a northern extension to Changping District. Additionally, there will be a branch line of the northern extension, which will serve the new Qinghe railway station, a station on the Beijing–Zhangjiakou intercity railway. On 11 January 2022, the second phase of Line 19 was listed as one of the 10 construction projects in the "Beijing Rail Transit Phase III Construction Plan (2022-2027)".

In 8 July 2022, an EIA document regarding Phase III construction of Beijing rail transport system (2022–2027) expanded the phase 2 planning.

References

Beijing Subway lines
Proposed public transport in China
Proposed buildings and structures in Beijing
Transport infrastructure under construction in China
Railway lines opened in 2021